Flemington is a lightly populated locality in the Hawke's Bay region of New Zealand's North Island.  It is located inland, south of Waipukurau and east of Ormondville.  Nearby settlements include Whetukura to the west, Te Uri to the south-southwest, and Wanstead to the east.

Flemington began a small European farming community called Boar Hills in 1845. Several stations were established in the following three decades. Flemington District was officially established in 1886.

For the purposes of the New Zealand census, Flemington falls within the area of Elsthorpe-Flemington.  This covers a large amount of southern Hawke's Bay south and east of Waipukurau, and it had a population of 2,949 at the 2001 census. This is not reflective of the population of the locality of Flemington itself, as it constitutes only a small part of the statistical region.

Flemington hosts an annual Mud Run every year. It hundreds of participants, many in fancy dress.

Education
Flemington School is a Year 1–8 co-educational state primary school.

The school was founded in 1908 before moving its current location in 1918.

Major improvements were made to the school for its centenary in 2008.

References 

Central Hawke's Bay District
Populated places in the Hawke's Bay Region